Hyde Hall Bridge is a wooden covered bridge over Shadow Brook built in 1825, on then-private property of Hyde Hall, a country mansion. Both are now included in Glimmerglass State Park. With the possible exception of the Hassenplug Bridge in Pennsylvania (also built in 1825), it is the oldest documented, existing covered bridge in the United States.  The World Guide to Covered Bridges and its entries of both the National Register of Historic Places and the Historic American Engineering Record list it as being constructed in 1825. The Historic American Buildings Survey entry for it shows an 1830 erection date.

The bridge consists of a single  span using a Burr Arch Truss and was constructed by master carpenter Cyrenus Clark with assistance from carpenter Andrew Alden and stonemason Lorenzo Bates. Renovations to the bridge were performed by the State of New York in 1967.

It is one of 29 historic covered bridges in New York State.

See also
List of bridges documented by the Historic American Engineering Record in New York (state)
List of covered bridges in New York

References

External links

Hyde Hall Bridge, at Covered Bridges of the Northeast USA

Bridges completed in 1825
Covered bridges on the National Register of Historic Places in New York (state)
Buildings and structures in Otsego County, New York
Historic American Buildings Survey in New York (state)
Historic American Engineering Record in New York (state)
Transportation in Otsego County, New York
Tourist attractions in Otsego County, New York
Wooden bridges in New York (state)
National Register of Historic Places in Otsego County, New York
Road bridges on the National Register of Historic Places in New York (state)
Burr Truss bridges in the United States
1825 establishments in New York (state)